Pazhayarai or Pazhaiyarai or Palayarai (Tamil: பழையாறை paḻaiyāṟai) was an ancient capital of the medieval Chola dynasty in Tamil Nadu. It is located on the banks of T.Patnam river, one of the tributaries of the river Cauvery. There are a number of villages within the area of historic Pazhaiyarai. The place was called Ayiratalli, meaning a land of thousand temples. The place is referred under various names like Ayiratalli, Pazhayar, Ahavamallakulakalapuram and Minavanaivenkadasolapuram.

The place was originally under the rule of Muttaraiyars, the feudatories of Pallava empire when it was called Avanaiapuram. The place attained its fame when it came under the regime of the Cholas. There are a number of inscriptions from the Chola dynasty associating the importance capital during the regime of Sundara (Parantaka II) (957-70). It retained it importance under the subsequent Chola kings, but when it switched hands to the Pandya dynasty, the place lost its importance. There are a number of temples associated with the place, with the major ones being Thenupuriswarar Temple, Patteeswaram, Pazhayarai Vadathali, Panchavan Madeviyar Pallippadai Temple, Thirunandipura Vinnagaram and Sakthivanesvara Temple.

Geography and etymology

There are lot of small villages inside the historical town of Pazhayarai - Thirunandipura Vinnagaram, Sathi mutram, Patteeswaram with all their temples. There were four legendary temples, Vadathali, Kelthali, Metrali and Thenthali across four sides of the city. The houses(veedu) of the warriors namely Aru padai veedu, Pudhu padai Veedu, Manapadai Veedu and Pambai padai veedu.It is located on the banks of T.Patnam river, one of the tributaries of the river Cauvery.  

Pazhayarai was originally called Ayiratalli, meaning the land of thousand temples. Western scholars attribute different names to the place like Ariyatalli, Mudikondacholapuram and Palaiyaru. The first literary mention of Pazhayarai is found in the 7th century Tamil Saiva canonic literature Thevaram by saint Sambandar. He mentions the Saiva temple occupied by Jains, which was cleared to be opened for Shiva worshippers under the influence of the saint on the ruling Muttaraiyar king. The saint went on to visit the Merrali or the western temple and the Thenupuriswarar Temple, Patteeswaram. Amaraneethi Nayanar, one of the 63 Nayanmars is believed to have progressed in the village. The place is also called Nandipuram, following the Pallava king of 7th century , who is believed to have built the Nathan Kovil in the place. The place came to be known as Avaninaryanapuram after the advent of Nandivarman III (846-869). The Chola king Virarajendra Chola (1063–1070) gave the name Ahavamallakulakalapuram, while Kulothunga I (1070–1120) named it Minavanaivenkadasolapuram.

History
The city was originally an important city during the rule of Pallavas in the 7th and 8th centuries. As per historians, the city was probably one of the capitals of their viceroys, the Muttaraiyars. During the regime of Vijayalaya Chola (848-71), the first medieval Chola emperor, the Muttariayars were defeated and the region came under Chola territory. The place was a capital city during the regime of Sundara (Parantaka II) (957-70). The city had palaces where members of the royal family resided even after shifting the capital to Thanjavur during the regime of Rajaraja Chola. There was only one palace for Vijayalaya Chola, but later individual palaces were built for all the princes. Rajaraja's sister Kundavai resided in the place and continued to issue orders and grants from the palace as seen in the inscriptions. Rajaraja I, who built the Big Temple of Thanjavur is said to have spent his last days in the city, the capital of his predecessors. During the regime of Rajendra I (1012-44), the capital was shifted to Gangaikonda Cholapuram, but the city Palayarai still retained its importance. The place started losing its importance during the late 12th to 13th centuries when the region was occupied by Pandyas. Systematic excavation was carried out in the place by the Department of Archaeology of the Government of Tamil Nadu in 1983-4 at Nandan Medu, Keezha Pazhayarai and Nathankoil. The excavations unearthed multiple dolmens and artefacts from the Chola regime. Though the region was predominantly occupied by Saivites and Vaishnavites, the verses from Appar during the 7th century indicate existence of Jaina colonies in the region, indicating a multi cultural coexistence.

Temples

Nathan Kovil (also called Thiru Nandipura Vinnagaram Temple), dedicated to the Hindu god Vishnu, is glorified in the Nalayira Divya Prabandham, the early medieval Tamil canon of the Alvar saints from the 6th–9th centuries CE. It is one of the 108 Divya Desams dedicated to Vishnu, who is worshipped as Jagannathan and his consort Lakshmi as Shenbagavalli. The original temple is believed to have been built during the Pallava regime. Parasunathar Temple, Muzhaiyur, a Shiva temple, is named after sage Parasurama, who is believed to have worshipped the presiding deity to propitiate himself off the curses due to the killing of his mother. Pazhayarai Vadathali, also called Dharmapureeswarar temple, is a Shiva temple is revered in the 7th century Saiva work Tevaram and classified as Padal petra stalam. The Hindu god Shiva is believed to have appeared as a column of fire. His consort, Parvati, unable to bear the heat, embraced Shiva, lending the name Sakthimutram (Shakti (Parvati) embracing Shiva) to the Sakthivanesvara Temple.

Thenupuriswarar Temple, a Shiva temple located in the village of Patteeswaram, is revered in the 7th century Tamil Saiva canonical work, the Tevaram, written by Tamil saint poets known as the Nayanars and classified as Paadal Petra Sthalam. The temple is associated with the legend of Sambandar to whose view Nandi moved to have a direct view of the presiding deity. Muthupandal festival celebrated in the temple is associated with the legend. Somanathaswami temple is a temple built during the regime of Rajaraja Chola and has inscriptions indicating gifts to the temple by Kundavai Nachiyar, the sister of the king. Airavatesvara Temple at Darasuram, built by Rajaraja Chola II in the 12th century CE is classified as a UNESCO World Heritage Site, along with the Brihadeeswara Temple at Thanjavur, the Gangaikondacholisvaram Temple at Gangaikonda Cholapuram that are referred to as the Great Living Chola Temples. Pazhayarai Metrali, Panchavan Madheeswaram, Brahmanandeeswaram, Darasuram temple, Brahmapureeswarar temple at Keezhakorkai are other temples in the region.

References

Former capital cities in India